Dylan Murray (born 1995) is an Irish hurler who plays for Offaly Senior Championship club Kilcormac/Killoughey. He is a former member of the Offaly senior hurling team, with whom he usually lined out as a forward.

Career

Murray first came to prominence at juvenile and underage levels with the Kilcormac–Killoughey club. He eventually joined the club's senior team and has since won three County Championship titles. Murray first appeared on the inter-county scene during a two-year stint with the Offaly minor team, before later lining out with the under-21 team. He joined the Offaly senior hurling team in 2019.

Honours

Kilcormac–Killoughey
Offaly Senior Hurling Championship: 2013, 2014, 2017

References

1995 births
Living people
Kilcormac-Killoughey hurlers
Offaly inter-county hurlers